Stephanie Denise "Tippy" Dos Santos-Porcuna (born August 16, 1994) is a Filipino American singer and actress. She first appeared on Ruffa & Ai in 2009.

Dos Santos is a member of ABS-CBN's circle of homegrown talents named Star Magic. In July 2013, Dos Santos collaborated with singers Sam Concepcion and Quest to interpret the song "Dati" composed by Thyro Alfaro and Yumi Lacsamana, which won the grand prize at the 2nd Philippine Popular Music Festival.

Filmography

Television

Film

Notes

References

External links
 
 
 

Living people
Star Magic
1994 births
Filipino film actresses
Filipino people of American descent
Filipino people of Brazilian descent
American expatriates in the Philippines
American musicians of Filipino descent
Actresses from Houston
Musicians from Houston
University of the Philippines Diliman alumni
VJs (media personalities)
Filipino television actresses